Asterix the Gladiator is the fourth volume of the Asterix comic book series, by René Goscinny (stories) and Albert Uderzo (illustrations). It was first serialized in the magazine  Pilote, issues 126–168, in 1962.

Plot summary
While stopping at the Roman Camp of Compendium, Prefect Odius Asparagus wants one of the indomitable Gauls as a present for Julius Caesar. Because none of the others can be captured, Centurion Gracchus Armisurplus decides on Cacofonix the bard.  Soldiers sent by the centurion, although driven away by Cacofonix's singing at first, counteract this by stuffing parsley in their ears and capture him easily.  A young boy named Picanmix 
from the village raises the alarm to Asterix and Obelix, and the Gauls attack Compendium; but learn that the prefect has already left in his galley with Cacofonix.

Asterix and Obelix therefore board a ship with Ekonomikrisis the Phoenician merchant, who agrees to take them to Rome after they save him from the pirates. In Rome, after Cacofonix has subjected the slaves in the prefect's galley to his bad singing, the prefect presents him to Julius Caesar; but when Caius Fatuous, the gladiators' trainer, declares Cacofonix unfit to serve as a gladiator, Caesar decides to throw the bard to the lions. Upon arrival in Rome, Asterix and Obelix befriend Instantmix (a Gaulish chef working in Rome) and visit the public baths. There, Caius Fatuous decides they would be perfect candidates for the gladiators' fights in the Circus Maximus, and he arranges to have them captured. That night, Asterix and Obelix visit Instantmix in his insula, where he identifies the location of Cacofonix. The next morning, the Gauls' first attempt at rescuing the bard fails when they raid the Circus prison and discover that Cacofonix has been transferred to a lower basement. Caius Fatuous has his men try to ambush them in groups of three, but Asterix and Obelix defeat them with ease, and apparently without taking notice.

Caius Fatuous then offers a reward of 10,000 sestertii to any citizen who captures Asterix and Obelix; but the two of them volunteer as gladiators to infiltrate the following Games, and Fatuous places them in training under his assistant Insalubrius. Soon, the Gauls demoralize Insalubrius and irritate Caius Fatuous by having the other gladiators play guessing-games instead of training.  Later, when Fatuous plans the Games to Julius Caesar, the Gauls go on a stroll, with Caius Fatuous (reluctantly) as their guide. On the eve before the games, Asterix and Obelix visit Cacofonix in his cell and inform him of their intentions to free him and the gladiators.

The next day, during the chariot races, Asterix and Obelix substitute themselves for an inebriated contestant, and win the race. As Cacofonix is put into the arena to be killed by the lions, he sings to the Romans, and thus frightens the lions into retreat; whereupon Caesar orders the gladiators' competition to begin. When Asterix, Obelix, and the gladiators introduce Caesar to their guessing-game, and Caesar insists on a martial contest, Asterix challenges a cohort of Caesar's own guard, and the two Gauls win easily. Seeing that the audience are amused, Caesar releases the three Gauls and grants them Fatuous as a prisoner.  Soon afterwards, the four men meet back up with Ekonomikrisis, and Asterix surprises him and his men by having Caius Fatuous row the ship back to the Gaulish Village alone. After a brief journey (plus a second run in with the pirates, which sinks their ship), the Gauls arrive home and Ekonomikrisis keeps his promise to return Caius Fatuous to Rome.  The villagers then celebrate the return of their heroes with a banquet, only with Cacofonix having to sit it out bound and gagged after offering to sing a song to celebrate his triumphant return.

This album is noteworthy in the Asterix series as the first in which Obelix says his famous catchphrase "These Romans are crazy!"

An audiobook of Asterix the Gladiator adapted by Anthea Bell and narrated by Willie Rushton was released on EMI Records Listen for Pleasure label in 1988.

Characters
Geriatrix (unnamed) – Obelix asks him to run his menhir delivery service while he is away. His feisty personality was not shown at this time, neither was the fact he is married.
Ekonomikrisis – Provides transport to and from Rome
Brutus – Featuring an amusingly ironic exchange with Julius Caesar at the circus.
The Pirates – parodying French comic "Barbe-Rouge" which was also serialized in Pilote at the time.

Notes
Obelix's helmet game – for the first time he collects helmets from the Romans he bashes, trying to outdo Asterix (who never shows much interest in it).
This is one of the few albums in which the banquet at the end is held during the day.
A noticeable mistake can be seen, when the Decurion who captured Cacofonix was first seen, he was wearing Bronze Armour. Later, he is seen wearing Steel Armour.

Reception 
On Goodreads, Asterix the Gladiator has a score of 4.19 out of 5.

Film adaptation
This album was combined with Asterix the Legionary for the 1985 animated film Asterix Versus Caesar.

References

External links 
Official English Website

Gladiator, Asterix the
Gladiatorial combat in fiction
Comics set in ancient Rome
Works originally published in Pilote
Literature first published in serial form
1964 graphic novels
Works by René Goscinny
Comics by Albert Uderzo
Depictions of Julius Caesar in comics
Cultural depictions of Marcus Junius Brutus